"I Can't Stop" is a song written by Jerry Goldstein and Wes Farrell and performed by The Osmonds.  The group released the song as a single three different times.  The song was originally released in 1967, but did not chart.

After the Osmonds left Uni Records and broke through as pop stars with "One Bad Apple" for MGM Records, Uni re-released "I Can't Stop" in 1971, when it reached #96 on the Billboard chart. Uni's successor MCA Records again re-released "I Can't Stop" in 1974 for the United Kingdom market, which reached #12 on the UK Singles chart.

The song was produced by Goldstein.

References

1967 songs
1967 singles
1971 singles
1974 singles
Songs written by Jerry Goldstein (producer)
Songs written by Wes Farrell
The Osmonds songs
Song recordings produced by Jerry Goldstein (producer)
MCA Records singles
Uni Records singles